is a passenger railway station in located in the city of Ayabe, Kyoto Prefecture, Japan, operated by West Japan Railway Company (JR West).

Lines

Station layout
The station consists of one ground-level side platform serving  single bi-directional track. There is no station building, but only a shelter on the platform. The station is unattended.

Adjacent stations

History
Fuchigaki Station opened on March 29, 1960. With the privatization of the Japan National Railways (JNR) on April 1, 1987, the station came under the aegis of the West Japan Railway Company.

Passenger statistics
In fiscal 2016, the station was used by an average of 167 passengers daily (boarding passengers only)

Surrounding area
 OMRON Ayabe Office
Ayabe Country Club
Ayabe Industrial Park
Ayabe City Industrial Park

See also
List of railway stations in Japan

External links

 0631601 Fuchigaki Station Official Site

Railway stations in Kyoto Prefecture
Railway stations in Japan opened in 1960
Ayabe, Kyoto